The 2018–19 ICC T20 World Cup Europe Qualifier was a cricket tournament that formed part of qualification process for the 2021 ICC T20 World Cup. Twelve regional qualifiers were held by the International Cricket Council (ICC), with 62 teams competing during 2018 in five regions – Africa (3 groups), Americas (2), Asia (2), East Asia Pacific (2) and Europe (3). The top 25 sides from these progressed to five Regional Finals in 2019, with seven teams then going on to compete in the 2019 ICC T20 World Cup Qualifier, along with the six lowest ranked sides from the ICC T20I Championship.

Eighteen countries from the European region competed in the initial phase of the tournament, divided into three groups of six each. Those matches took place in the Netherlands between 29 August and 2 September 2018. The top two of each group advanced to the ICC World T20 Europe Regional Finals in 2019. In April 2018, the International Cricket Council (ICC) granted full international status to Twenty20 men's matches played between member sides from 1 January 2019 onwards. Therefore, all the matches in the Regional Finals were played as Twenty20 Internationals (T20Is).

Three of the fixtures on day one of the qualifiers were abandoned because of rain. All three matches were replayed on the tournament's reserve day, 31 August 2018. Denmark and Germany qualified from Group A for the Regional Finals. They were joined by Italy and Jersey from Group B, and Norway and Guernsey from Group C.

The Regional Finals were held in Guernsey in June 2019. Jersey progressed to the T20 World Cup Qualifier after winning the Regional Finals. Jersey finished level on points with Germany, with Jersey advancing with a better net run rate.

Teams

Group A

Points table

(Q) Qualified to Regional Finals

Fixtures

Group B

Points table

(Q) Qualified to Regional Finals

Fixtures

Group C

Points table

(Q) Qualified to Regional Final

Fixtures

Regional Finals

The Regional Finals took place in Guernsey from 15 to 20 June 2019. Germany announced their squad for the finals on 14 May 2019, which included three players (Ollie Rayner, Craig Meschede and Dieter Klein) with experience playing for county teams in English domestic cricket, although only Meschede joined up with the final squad. On 31 May 2019, the ICC confirmed all of the squads for the Regional Finals. During the tournament, Michael Richardson, who has also played in English domestic cricket, was added to Germany's squad, replacing the injured Daniel Weston.

At the mid-point of the Regional Final, Jersey and Italy had pulled clear from the other teams, both recording three wins from three matches. All four fixtures scheduled to take place on 18 June were washed out, with them being moved to the reserve day on 20 June. On the last day of fixtures, Jersey won the group to advance to the 2019 ICC T20 World Cup Qualifier, despite losing to Germany in the last match of the Regional Finals, progressing due to a superior net run rate.

Points table

Fixtures

Notes

References

External links
 Europe group at the International Cricket Council
 Series home at ESPN Cricinfo (Finals)

ICC Men's T20 World Cup Qualifier
2021 ICC Men's T20 World Cup
International cricket competitions in 2019